Pokrovka is a rural locality (a selo) and the administrative centre of Oktyabrsky District, Primorsky Krai, Russia. Population:

References

Rural localities in Primorsky Krai